Arven (also known as Next of Kin) is a 1979 Norwegian drama film directed by Anja Breien. It was entered into the 1979 Cannes Film Festival.

Plot
At a funeral for a successful business man, the last will and testament is to be read. People at the funeral will all inherit the family company if it is jointly run by all the heirs.

Cast
 Espen Skjønberg - Jon Skaug
 Anita Björk - Märta Skaug
 Häge Juve - Hanna Skaug
 Jan Hårstad - Jonas Skaug
 Jannik Bonnevie - Eva Skaug
 Jonas Brunvoll - Presten
 Pelle Christensen - Advokaten
 Jack Fjeldstad - Sam Pettersen
 Mona Hofland - Rut Petersen
 Svein Sturla Hungnes - Arne Torjussen
 Ada Kramm - Fru Marie Skaug
 Eva Opaker - Gerd Skaug

References

External links

1979 films
1970s Norwegian-language films
1979 drama films
Films directed by Anja Breien
Norwegian drama films